William Robert "Bob" Eccles (born 10 July 1957) is an English former professional rugby league footballer who played in the 1970s, 1980s and 1990s, and coached in the 1990s.

Background
Bob Eccles was born in St Helens, Lancashire, England.

Playing career

International honours
Bob Eccles won a cap for Great Britain while at Warrington in 1982 against Australia. He had previously played twice for Great Britain Under-24s.

County Cup Final appearances
Bob Eccles played right-, i.e. number 12, (replaced by interchange/substitute Ian Potter) in Warrington's 26–10 victory over Wigan in the 1980 Lancashire County Cup Final during the 1980–81 season at Knowsley Road, St. Helens, on Saturday 4 October 1980, played left-, i.e. number 11, and scored a try in the 16–0 victory over St. Helens in the 1982 Lancashire County Cup Final during the 1982–83 season at Central Park, Wigan on Saturday 23 October 1982, and played left-, i.e. number 8, in the 8–34 defeat by Wigan in the 1985 Lancashire County Cup Final during the 1985–86 season at Knowsley Road, St. Helens, on Sunday 13 October 1985,

John Player Trophy Final appearances
Bob Eccles played as an interchange/substitute, i.e. number 15, (replacing  Edwin Hunter) in Warrington's 12–5 victory over Barrow in the 1980–81 John Player Trophy Final during the 1980–81 season at Central Park, Wigan on Saturday 24 January 1981.

Club records
Bob Eccles made his début for Warrington on Wednesday14 September 1977, he is second in Warrington's "Most Tries in a Season" list with 37-tries scored in the 1982–83 season only bettered by Brian Bevan, 10 years later he topped the try scoring at Barrow with 20 Tries, he also equalled Warrington's "Most Tries in a Match" for a Forward record with 5-tries scored in the 36–15 victory over Blackpool Borough on Sunday 12 December 1982, he played his last match for Warrington on Sunday 17 May 1987, and on Sunday 16 March 2014 he was inducted into the Warrington Hall of Fame.

References

External links
!Great Britain Statistics at englandrl.co.uk (statistics currently missing due to not having appeared for both Great Britain, and England)
Statistics at wolvesplayers.thisiswarrington.co.uk

1957 births
Living people
Barrow Raiders players
Blackpool Borough coaches
Blackpool Borough players
Chorley Lynx coaches
English rugby league coaches
English rugby league players
Great Britain national rugby league team players
Lancashire rugby league team players
Rochdale Hornets coaches
Rugby league players from St Helens, Merseyside
Rugby league second-rows
Warrington Wolves players